Aleksandăr Lûdskanov (family name sometimes also transliterated  as Lyutskanov) (Sofia, 21 April 1926 – 1976) was a Bulgarian translator, semiotician, mathematician, and expert on machine translation. Ludskanov's work focused on linking translation and semiotics by defining the key component of translation as semiotic transfer, which he defined as replacing the signs that encode a message with signs from another code while doing the utmost to maintain "invariant information with respect to a given system of reference." In 1975, Ludskanov published an article called "A semiotic approach to the theory of translation" that argued that semiotics "does not provide the concept of semiotic transformation, though such transformations certainly exist."

References 

Hoepli 2008 Lûdskanov, A., Un approccio semiotico alla traduzione. Dalla prospettiva informatica alla scienza traduttiva, ed. Bruno Osimo, Hoepli 2008, Milano.
John Benjamins 2000Paskaleva, E., Alexander Ljudskanov, in Early Years in Machine Translation. Memoirs and bibliographies of pioneers, ed. W. J. Hutchins. 2000 John Benjamins, Amsterdam-Philadelphia.

1976 deaths
1926 births
Bulgarian translators
Bulgarian mathematicians
Bulgarian semioticians
Machine translation researchers
20th-century translators